Blind Hookey, also known as Dutch Bank, Banker and Broker and Honest John, is a simple game of chance using playing cards. The game is popular in Germany where it is known as Häufeln, Bockspiel or Päckchen wenden, after the little packets of cards used.

History 
Häufeln is recorded as early as 1773 as a card game in which there are as many piles (Häufeln) as players. The name Blind Hookey appears in 1824 in Gallignani's Messenger. In 1835, Häufeln, is described as "a pernicious game of chance, similar to Pharo." But it was also played as a family game for e.g. nuts.

Rules 
Either a 52-card, French-suited pack is used or a 32-card French- or German-suited pack. The banker shuffles, offers the cards for cutting, places any number of piles of cards face down on the table and keeps one for himself, selected by the punters. The punters then bet on the rest. 

The bottom cards in the piles decide who wins and loses:
If the lowest card in a pile is higher than the banker's card, the punter wins 1:1; if the bottom card is equal or lower in rank, the banker wins.

House advantage 
Winning and losing are decided by two cards:
 If the banker and punter have different cards, they are likely to win ½, and so neither party has an advantage.
 However, if the two cards are equal in rank, the banker wins: the probability that a pair will occur when two cards are drawn from a pack of 52 is just 3 : 51 or 1/17 = 5.9%. If you play with a pack of 32 German-suited or Piquet cards, the probability is 3 : 31 = 9.7%.

Thus the house advantage is:
 5.9 % if a pack of 52 French-suited cards is used
 9.7 % if a pack of 32 cards is used

If, in the case of cards of equal rank, the banker collects only half the stakes, the house advantage reduces to 1/34 = 2.9% when using a pack of 52 cards, or to 3/62 = 4.8% when using a pack of 32 cards.

References

Literature 
 Adelung, Johann Christoph (1773). Versuch eines Vollständigen Grammatisch-Kritischen Wörterbuches der Hochdeutschen Mundart. Part 2 (F–K). Leipzig: Breitkopf.
 
 _ (1908). Meyers Konversationslexikon.
 
 
 
 

Banking games
German gambling games